Daniel Peter (9 March 1836 – 4 November 1919) was a Swiss-French chocolatier and entrepreneur who founded Peter's Chocolate. A neighbour of Henri Nestlé in Vevey, he was one of the first chocolatiers to make milk chocolate and is credited for inventing it, in 1875 or 1876, by adding powdered milk to the chocolate.

Life 
Peter was born on 9 March 1836 in Moudon, in the canton of Vaud, to Jean Samuel Peter, a butcher, and Jeanne-Louise Laurent, in a family of Alsatian origin. He began his commercial apprenticeship in Vevey, where in 1856 he established the candle-making business Frères Peter, but soon he diversified his business to include chocolate fabrication, as demand for his candles fell, owing to the introduction of affordable kerosene lamps. He married in 1863 to Fanny-Louise Cailler, a daughter of François-Louis Cailler, also a chocolatier.

When Peter came up with the process of making milk chocolate in 1857, he had a problem with removing the water from the milk, which caused mildew to form. It was not until he enlisted the cooperation of Henri Nestlé, then a baby-food manufacturer who had invented a milk-condensation process, that finally, in 1875, after seven years of effort, he was able to bring the product onto the market. However, it is only after many years of fine-tuning that the original formula was developed and, in 1887, the Gala Peter brand was finally launched. Daniel Peter called his product 'Gala' after the Greek word meaning 'milk'. From these developments, Switzerland soon dominated the chocolate market. Earlier, in 1896, Daniel Peter wrote:

Daniel Peter also launched the Delta Peter brand, which consisted of milk and cocoa powder that could be added to water to make a chocolate drink. Peter used a triangular packaging, with each individual triangle of pressed powder to be used for one cup.

Earlier, in 1879, Daniel Peter and Henri Nestlé formed a partnership that organised the Nestlé Company, eventually one of the largest of Europe-based confection industries, into existence. In 1904, he eventually merged with the Kohler company. All Peter, Cailler and Kohler brands were bought by Nestlé in 1929.

Daniel Peter died on 4 November 1919 in Vevey.

References

1836 births
1919 deaths
19th-century Swiss businesspeople
Swiss chocolatiers
Businesspeople in confectionery
People from Broye-Vully District
People from Vevey
Nestlé people
Candlemakers
19th-century Swiss inventors

{{food-
-stub}}